In mechanical engineering, limits and fits are a set of rules regarding the dimensions and tolerances of mating machined parts if they are to achieve the desired ease of assembly, and security after assembly - sliding fit, interference fit, rotating fit, non-sliding fit, loose fit, etc.

Tolerances are typically specified in thousandths of an inch or hundredths of a millimetre.

See also
Engineering tolerance
Engineering fit

References

External links
http://mechanical-design-handbook.blogspot.co.uk/2009/10/standards-of-limits-and-fits-for-mating.html

Mechanical engineering